Asia Island (Spanish: Isla de Asia, Isla Asia) is a Peruvian island on the Pacific Ocean off the coast of Cañete Province, region of Lima.

References

Pacific islands of Peru